Bernhard Reitshammer (born 17 June 1994) is an Austrian swimmer. He represented Austria at the 2019 World Aquatics Championships held in Gwangju, South Korea and he finished in 49th place in the heats in the men's 50 metre freestyle event. He also represented Austria at the 2022 World Aquatics Championships held in Budapest, Hungary.

In April 2021, Reitshammer qualified to represent Austria at the 2020 Summer Olympics in Tokyo, Japan, where he went on to compete in the 100 metre backstroke, 100 metre breaststroke and 200 metre individual medley events.

References

External links
 

Living people
1994 births
Place of birth missing (living people)
Austrian male freestyle swimmers
Austrian male breaststroke swimmers
Austrian male backstroke swimmers
Male medley swimmers
Swimmers at the 2020 Summer Olympics
Olympic swimmers of Austria
20th-century Austrian people
21st-century Austrian people
European Aquatics Championships medalists in swimming